Maria Nomikou (born March 30, 1993 in Athens, Greece) is a female professional volleyball player from Greece, who is a member of the Greece women's national volleyball team.

Sporting achievements

Clubs

International competitions
 2017/2018 : CEV Women's Challenge Cup, with Olympiacos S.F. Piraeus

National championships
 2017/2018  Hellenic Championship, with Olympiacos Piraeus
 2018/2019  Hellenic Championship, with Olympiacos Piraeus

National trophies
 2012/2013  Cup of Italy, with G.S.O. Villa Cortese
 2017/2018  Hellenic Cup, with Olympiacos  Piraeus
 2018/2019  Hellenic Cup, with Olympiacos  Piraeus

National Super Cups
 2011/2012  Super Cup of Italy, with G.S.O. Villa Cortese

Individual awards
 2017–18 A1 Ethniki Women's Volleyball "Most Valuable Player"
 2018–19 A1 Ethniki Women's Volleyball "Most Valuable Player"

References

External links
 profile at greekvolley.gr 
 profile at CEV web site at cev.eu
 Olympiacos Women's Volleyball team at Olympiacos official web site (www.olympiacossfp.gr)
 Hellenic Women National Team - caps www.volleyball.gr

Panathinaikos Women's Volleyball players
Olympiacos Women's Volleyball players
Greek women's volleyball players
1993 births
Living people
Volleyball players from Athens
21st-century Greek women